NGC 5364 is a grand design spiral galaxy located 54.5 million light years away in the constellation Virgo. It is inclined to the line of sight from the Earth at an angle of 47° along a position angle of 25°. It is a member of the NGC 5364 Group of galaxies, itself one of the Virgo III Groups strung out to the east of the Virgo Supercluster of galaxies.

Structure

The morphological classification of NGC 5364 in the De Vaucouleurs system is SA(rs)bc pec, which indicates it has an incomplete ring structure (rs) in the inner part of the galaxy with moderate to loosely wound arms (bc) and has a peculiar aspect (pec). In particular, the appearance of the spiral arms is amorphous and asymmetrical compared to other galaxies with a similar classification. A companion galaxy, NGC 5363, is located to the north of NGC 5364 and their gravitational interaction may be influencing the peculiar morphology of the latter.

The mid-infrared emission in the nucleus appears weak compared to the spiral arms, suggesting a low rate of star formation in the core region. Multiple H II regions lie along the spiral arms, tracing out their extent. Each of the two main arms wrap all the way around the galaxy, although they display patchiness along much of their length.

NGC designation

This object was discovered by William Herschel on February 2, 1786, and later listed as NGC 5364. It was subsequently rediscovered by John Herschel on April 7, 1828, and later listed as NGC 5317.

References

External links 

Unbarred spiral galaxies
Virgo (constellation)
5364
49555
08853